Düsseldorf Airport (until March 2013 Düsseldorf International Airport) is the international airport of Düsseldorf, the capital of the German state of North Rhine-Westphalia.

Düsseldorf is the fourth largest airport in Germany and handled almost 8 million passengers in 2021. It is a hub for Eurowings and a focus city for several more airlines. The airport has three passenger terminals and two runways and can handle wide-body aircraft up to the Airbus A380.

Overview

Usage
Düsseldorf Airport is the largest and primary airport for the Rhine-Ruhr metropolitan region – the largest metropolitan region in Germany and among the largest metropolitan areas of the world. The airport is located in Düsseldorf-Lohausen. The largest nearby business centres are Düsseldorf and Essen; other cities within a  radius are Duisburg, Krefeld, Mülheim an der Ruhr, Neuss, and Wuppertal. The airport extends over a compact  of land – small in comparison to airports of a similar capacity, but also a reason for Düsseldorf being known as an airport of short distances. The airport has more than 18,200 employees.

With around 16 million passengers passing through in 2022, the airport was just the fourth busiest in Germany, after Frankfurt Airport, Munich Airport and Berlin Brandenburg Airport. Düsseldorf took a huge drop in the List of the busiest airports in Europe, being only number 31 behind Pulkovo Airport.

Ownership
The city of Düsseldorf owns half the airport, with the other half owned by various commercial entitites, including ARI which is itself owned by the Irish Government. Düsseldorf Airport is a public–private partnership with the following owners:
 50% city of Düsseldorf
 50% Airport Partners GmbH (owners: 40% AviAlliance GmbH, 40% Aer Rianta International cpt, 20% AviC GmbH & Co. KGaA)

History

Early years

The current airport was opened on 19 April 1927, after two years of construction. The first international route was inaugurated by SABENA in 1929 between Brussels, Antwerp, Düsseldorf and Hamburg.

At the beginning of World War II civil use of the airport ceased in September 1939 and the airfield was used by the military. After the end of the war the airport reopened for civil use in 1948. With the area under British administration, the first international flights were operated by British European Airways to London.

Since 1950, the airport is owned by a state-owned operations company.

On 1 April 1955, Lufthansa started services between Düsseldorf, Frankfurt am Main and Munich, which still exist today. In 1959, the first scheduled jet aircraft landed in Düsseldorf on Scandinavian Airlines' route Copenhagen-Khartoum. In 1961, LTU relocated its home base from Cologne Bonn Airport and in the same year, Düsseldorf Airport handled more than 1 million passengers for the first time.

In 1969 the main runway was lengthened to 3000 metres while a new second terminal was under construction. The new Terminal 2, which is today's Terminal B, opened in April 1973. Another addition, today's Terminal A, was opened already in 1977 while the last annex, Terminal C, opened in 1986.

Düsseldorf Airport fire

On 11 April 1996, the Düsseldorf Airport fire, which is the worst structural airport fire worldwide to date, broke out. It was caused by welding work on an elevated road in front of Terminal A above its arrivals area. Insufficient structural fire protection allowed the fire and especially the smoke to spread fast, so these destroyed large parts of the passenger areas of the airport. Seventeen people died, mostly due to smoke inhalation, with many more hospitalised. At the time, the fire was the biggest public disaster in the history of North Rhine-Westphalia. Damage to the airport was estimated to be in the hundreds of millions, Terminals A and B had to be completely reconstructed. While repairs were ongoing, passengers were housed in big tents.

In November 1997, Terminal C was completely redeveloped, with three lightweight construction halls serving as departure areas. Also in 1997 construction began on the new inter-city railway station at the eastern edge of the airport. In 1998 the rebuilt Terminal A was reopened and the airport changed its name from "Rhine Ruhr Airport" to "Düsseldorf International". Reconstruction of the central building and Terminal B began in the same year.

Development since the 2000s

The first construction stage in the "Airport 2000+" programme commenced in 1998 with the laying of a foundation stone for an underground parking garage under the new terminal.

The new Düsseldorf Airport station was opened in May 2000, with the capacity of 300 train departures daily. Sixteen million passengers used the airport that year; Düsseldorf is now the third-biggest airport in Germany. The new departures hall and Terminal B were opened in July 2001 after 2½ years of construction time; the rebuilt Gebäude Ost (East Building) was reopened.

In 2002, the inter-terminal shuttle bus service was replaced by the suspended monorail called the SkyTrain connecting the terminal building with the InterCity train station. The system was developed by Siemens and is based on the similar H-Bahn operating with two lines on Dortmund university campus.

On 12 November 2006, the first Airbus A380 landed in Düsseldorf as part of a Lufthansa promotional flight.

In March 2013, the Airport received a new corporate design and dropped the phrase International from its official name.

In January 2015, Emirates announced it will schedule the Airbus A380 on one of their two daily flights from Dubai to Düsseldorf starting in July 2015. In May 2015, the airport finished construction of the new facilities needed to handle the A380, including a parking position with three jet-bridges, widened taxiways and new ground handling equipment.

In June 2015, Lufthansa announced the closure its long-haul base at Düsseldorf Airport for economic reasons by October 2015. The base consisted of two Airbus A340-300s which served Newark and Chicago-O'Hare. Newark remained a year-round service which is operated in a W-pattern from Munich Airport (Munich - Newark - Düsseldorf - Newark - Munich) while the Chicago service was suspended for the winter 2015/2016 season. A few months later, Lufthansa announced the cancellation of the Düsseldorf-Chicago route. The same route has been served by American Airlines during the summer seasons from 2013 to 2016, when it was discontinued.

In January 2017, the airport's largest hub operator Air Berlin announced a massive downsizing of its operations due to restructuring measures. While some leisure routes were handed to Niki more than a dozen destinations have been cancelled entirely. In August 2017, Air Berlin also announced the termination of all long-haul routes from Düsseldorf to destinations in the Caribbean on short notice due to the ongoing bankruptcy proceedings. However, both Condor and Eurowings announced it would step in and start some of the terminated Caribbean destinations by themselves. Shortly after, Air Berlin also announced the termination of all remaining long-haul operations leading to the loss of several connections to the United States at Düsseldorf Airport. On 9 October 2017, Air Berlin announced the termination of all of its own operations, excluding wetleases, by the end of the month leading to the loss of one of the airport's largest customers.

In February 2018, Eurowings announced the relocatation of all long-haul routes currently served from Cologne Bonn Airport to Düsseldorf by late October 2018 to strengthen their presence there.

In March 2018, Lufthansa announced it would to close its base at Düsseldorf Airport after the 2018/2019 winter schedule which ended in March 2019. When the single remaining long-haul route to Newark was taken over by Eurowings, 400 staff members were offered a relocation to either Frankfurt Airport or Munich Airport. In November 2018, Ryanair also announced they would close their base in Düsseldorf after only a year. Their routes were taken over by Lauda.

In August 2020, Delta Air Lines removed the Atlanta route from their schedule. Shortly after, Ryanair announced the closure of its base in Düsseldorf - which has been operated on a wetlease basis by Lauda - by 24 October 2020. In September 2020, Singapore Airlines removed the route to Singapore from their schedule.

In autumn of 2022, german airline Sundair drastically reduced its operations from Düsseldorf, leaving a single route to Beirut. The two previously based aircraft were relocated. In January 2023 it became public that Sundair would not return to Düsseldorf in summer season of 2023 with any flight, eradicating its former base from the network.

Facilities

Terminals

Düsseldorf Airport has three terminals connected by a central spine, even though the terminals are essentially concourses within a single terminal building. The current terminal buildings are capable of handling up to 22 million passengers per year.

Terminal A
Terminal A was opened in 1977 and has 16 gates (A01–A16) used by Lufthansa and Eurowings, its airline partners and Star Alliance members, Austrian Airlines, Croatia Airlines, LOT Polish Airlines, Scandinavian Airlines, TAP Air Portugal, and Swiss International Air Lines. Terminal A houses two Lufthansa lounges. It was refurbished fundamentally for two years after the 1996 fire.

Terminal B
Terminal B was originally inaugurated in 1973 and has 11 gates (B01–B11) used for domestic and EU-flights by a few Star Alliance members such as Aegean Airlines, but mainly by SkyTeam and Oneworld members like Air France, British Airways, KLM, Finnair, Iberia and ITA Airways. Also located within this terminal are leisure carriers such as TUIfly and Condor. Terminal B houses an observation deck and one contract lounge. After the fire in 1996 the whole terminal building was torn down and reconstructed. It was reopened in 2001.

Terminal C
Terminal C was opened in 1986 and has 8 gates (C01–C08) used exclusively for non-Schengen-flights by non-Star Alliance airlines (except Turkish Airlines). These are long-haul flights – among others – by Emirates and Etihad Airways. Terminal C has a direct access to Airport City's Maritim Hotel, part of a German hotel chain, and houses lounges operated by the airport and Emirates. Terminal C was the least affected Terminal after the fire in 1996. It was still reopened in 1996 after intensive maintenance works. Thus it was the only usable Terminal at Düsseldorf Airport for a couple of years. Terminal C features the airport's only parking position equipped with three jet-bridges to handle the Airbus A380.

Executive Terminal
Jet Aviation operates a small terminal solely for private and corporate customers.

Runways and apron

Airport City
Already based at Düsseldorf Airport City are corporate offices of Siemens and VDI, a large Porsche centre and showroom, a Maritim Hotel and Congress Centre and a Sheraton Hotel. Messe Düsseldorf is situated in close proximity to Düsseldorf Airport City (some ).

Airlines and destinations
The following airlines offer regular scheduled and charter flights at Düsseldorf Airport:

Statistics

Passengers and freight

Busiest routes

Source: Düsseldorf Airport

Largest airlines

Source: Düsseldorf Airport

Ground transportation

Train

Düsseldorf Airport has two railway stations: 
The S-Bahn station, Düsseldorf Airport Terminal station located below the terminal. It is served by the S11 suburban line, which has its northern terminus there.
The main station, 2.5 km from the terminal, is served by all other categories of railway, including ICE high-speed trains. A fully automatic suspended monorail called SkyTrain connects this station to the airport parking areas and the passenger terminals and also serves as an inter-terminal connection.

Road
The airport can be reached via its own motorway section which is part of the motorway A44 (Belgium – Kassel, Exit Düsseldorf-Flughafen) which also connects to motorways A52, A57 and A3. There are also several local bus lines connecting the airport with nearby areas and Düsseldorf city center.

Other facilities
 Düsseldorf Airport had the headquarters of Air Berlin's technical training facilities and also served as one of their maintenance bases.
 When LTU International existed, its head office was in Halle 8 at Düsseldorf Airport.
 The corporate head office of Blue Wings was also located in Terminal A at the airport.

Incidents and accidents
On 22 December 1955, a Manx Airlines Douglas C-47 on a positioning flight crashed at DUS attempting a visual approach rather than an instrument landing system approach in low clouds. The aircraft descended too low and struck trees, crashing about three miles from the runway. All three occupants were killed.

On 3 November 1957, a Karl Herfurtner Düsseldorf Douglas C-54 crashed into a residential area 4.5 km (2.8 mi) S of DUS after takeoff due to mismanagement of the flight by the chief pilot. There were six fatalities out of the 10 on board and one killed on the ground.

See also
 Transport in Germany
A German court ruled that naming the airport after Düsseldorf would be misleading to passengers; however, some airlines still use that name in advertisements outside Germany.

References

External links

 Official website 
 
 

 
Airports established in 1927
Buildings and structures in North Rhine-Westphalia
Transport in Düsseldorf
SIPEM people movers
People mover systems in Germany
1927 establishments in Germany